Cheshmeh-ye Biglar (also Romanized as Cheshmeh-ye Bīglar; also known as Cheshmeh Beglar) is a village in Kanduleh Rural District, Dinavar District, Sahneh County, Kermanshah Province, Iran. At the 2006 census, its population was 43, in 9 families.

References 

Populated places in Sahneh County